The Head of the Sakha Republic is the highest office in the Sakha Republic. The term of office is five years.

History 
The office was first introduced in 1991. Before April 2014 it was known as the President of the Sakha Republic.

The first presidential elections in Yakutia were on 20 December 1991. Yakutia inherited the Soviet electoral system with no real multi-party system to be established. There were only two candidates in the election. The chairman of the Supreme Soviet of the Yakut ASSR Mikhail Nikolayev won with 76.7% of the vote. Nikolayev was reelected in 1996 and succeeded by his former vice president Vyacheslav Shtyrov in January 2002. Five years later Shtyrov's appointment for second term which was proposed by President Vladimir Putin was approved by the State Assembly of Yakutia. After his resignation in May 2010 President of Russia Dmitry Medvedev appointed prime minister of the region Yegor Borisov as acting president. He was inaugurated on 17 June 2010. Since the beginning of Borisov's second term in 2014 the President of the Republic of Sakha (Yakutia) became known as the Head of the Republic.

List of office-holders 

The most recent election for the office was held on 9 September 2018.

References

External links
 glava.sakha.gov.ru – official web portal of the Head of the Sakha Republic 

 
Politics of the Sakha Republic
Sakha Republic